The 15th César Awards ceremony, presented by the Académie des Arts et Techniques du Cinéma, honoured the best French films of 1989 and took place on 4 March 1990 at the Théâtre des Champs-Élysées in Paris. The ceremony was chaired by Kirk Douglas and hosted by Ève Ruggiéri. Too Beautiful for You won the award for Best Film.

Winners and nominees
The winners are highlighted in bold:

Best Film:Too Beautiful for You, directed by Bertrand BlierMonsieur Hire, directed by Patrice LeconteNocturne indien, directed by Alain CorneauUn monde sans pitié, directed by Eric RochantLa Vie et rien d'autre, directed by Bertrand Tavernier
Best Foreign Film:Dangerous Liaisons, directed by Stephen FrearsDom za vesanje, directed by Emir KusturicaNuovo cinema Paradiso, directed by Giuseppe TornatoreRain Man, directed by Barry LevinsonSex, Lies, and Videotape, directed by Steven Soderbergh 
Best First Work:Un monde sans pitié, directed by Éric RochantPeaux de vaches, directed by Patricia MazuyLa Salle de bain, directed by John LvoffLa Soule, directed by Michel SibraSuivez cet avion, directed by Patrice AmbardTolérance, directed by Pierre-Henry Salfati
Best Actor:Philippe Noiret, for La Vie et rien d'autreLambert Wilson, for Hiver 54, l'abbé PierreMichel Blanc, for Monsieur HireJean-Hugues Anglade, for Nocturne indienGérard Depardieu, for Trop belle pour toi Hippolyte Girardot, for Un monde sans pitié  
Best Actress:Carole Bouquet, for Trop belle pour toiEmmanuelle Béart, for Les Enfants du désordreSandrine Bonnaire, for Monsieur Hire Josiane Balasko, for Trop belle pour toiSabine Azéma, for La Vie et rien d'autre
Best Supporting Actor:Robert Hirsch, for Hiver 54, l'abbé PierreJacques Bonnaffé, for BaptêmeFrançois Cluzet, for Force majeure Roland Blanche, for Trop belle pour toiFrançois Perrot, for La Vie et rien d'autre
Best Supporting Actress:Suzanne Flon, for La VouivreSabine Haudepin, for Force majeure Micheline Presle, for I Want to Go HomeLudmila Mikaël, for Noce blancheClémentine Célarié, for Nocturne indien
Most Promising Actor: Yvan Attal, for Un monde sans pitiéJean-Yves Berteloot, for BaptêmePhilippe Volter, for Les Bois noirsThierry Fortineau, for Comédie d'étéMelvil Poupaud, for La Fille de 15 ans
Most Promising Actress:Vanessa Paradis, for Noce blanche Valérie Stroh, for BaptêmeDominique Blanc, for Je suis le seigneur du châteauIsabelle Gélinas, for Suivez cet avionMireille Perrier, for Un monde sans pitié 
Best Director:Bertrand Blier, for Trop belle pour toi Patrice Leconte, for Monsieur HireAlain Corneau, for Nocturne indienMiloš Forman, for ValmontBertrand Tavernier, for La Vie et rien d'autre
Best Writing:Bertrand Blier, for Trop belle pour toi Pierre Jolivet, Olivier Schatzky, for Force majeureÉric Rochant, for Un monde sans pitiéBertrand Tavernier, Jean Cosmos, for La Vie et rien d'autre  
Best Cinematography: Yves Angelo, for Nocturne indienPhilippe Rousselot, for Trop belle pour toiBruno de Keyzer, for La Vie et rien d'autre  
Best Costume Design: Theodor Pistek, for Valmont Catherine Leterrier, for La Révolution française ("Les Années Lumières" and "Les Années Terribles" segments)Jacqueline Moreau, for La Vie et rien d'autre
Best Sound:Pierre Lenoir, Dominique Hennequin, for Monsieur HireClaude Villand, Pierre Gamet, for Bunker Palace HôtelGérard Lamps, William Flageollet, Michel Desrois, for La Vie et rien d'autre  
Best Editing:Claudine Merlin, for Trop belle pour toiJoëlle Hache, Claudine Merlin, for Monsieur HireArmand Psenny, for La Vie et rien d'autre  
Best Music:Oswald d'Andréa, for La Vie et rien d'autreMichael Nyman, for Monsieur HireGérard Torikian, for Un monde sans pitié
Best Production Design:Pierre Guffroy, for ValmontMichèle Abbé-Vannier, for Bunker Palace HôtelThéobald Meurisse, for Trop belle pour toi
Best Animated Short:Le Porte-plume, directed by Marie-Christine PerrodinSculpture sculptures, directed by Jean-Loup Felicioli
Best Fiction Short:Lune froide, directed by Patrick BouchiteyCe qui me meut, directed by Cédric KlapischVol nuptial, directed by Dominique Crèvecoeur 
Best Documentary Short:Chanson pour un marin, directed by Bernard AubouyLe Faucon de Notre-Dame, directed by Claude Farny
Honorary César:Philippe DormoyGérard Philipe (posthumous)

See also
 62nd Academy Awards
 43rd British Academy Film Awards

External links
 Official website
 
 15th César Awards at AlloCiné

1990
1990 film awards
Ces